Lutterade is a district of Geleen and later Sittard-Geleen (a municipality in the southeastern Netherlands, in the province of Limburg).

Transportation
Railway Station: Geleen-Lutterade

External links
 Station Geleen Lutterade

Sittard-Geleen
Mining communities in the Netherlands